The Chrono Champenois is a European individual time trial bicycle race held around Bétheny in France, in the Champagne region.  The race has been organised as a 1.2 event since 1989 for women's and since 1998 there is also a men's race which is part of the UCI Europe Tour. The women's race is fully called: Chrono Champenois - Trophée Européen. The 2017 event was cancelled late in the season, with the organiser planning to hold the race again in 2018.

Winners

Men's (Chrono Champenois)

Women's (Chrono Champenois - Trophée Européen)

References

External links

Chrono Champenois – Trophée Européen
UCI Europe Tour races
Cycle races in France
Recurring sporting events established in 1989
1989 establishments in France
Women's road bicycle races